Clavulariidae is a family of soft corals in the suborder Stolonifera. Colonies in this family consist of separate retractable polyps growing from a horizontal, encrusting stolon or basal membrane. The tissues are stiffened by sclerites.

Genera
The World Register of Marine Species includes the following genera in the family:

Altumia Benayahu, McFadden & Shoham, 2017
Azoriella (Lopez Gonzalez & Gili, 2001)
Bathytelesto Bayer, 1981
Carijoa Mueller, 1867
Clavularia Blainville, 1830
Cryptophyton Williams, 2000
Cyathopodium Verrill, 1868
Denhartogia Ocaña & van Ofwegen, 2003
Inconstantia McFadden & van Ofwegen, 2012
Incrustatus van Ofwegen, Häussermann & Försterra, 2007
Knopia Alderslade & McFadden, 2007
Moolabalia Alderslade, 2001
Paratelesto Utinomi, 1958
Phenganax Alderslade & McFadden, 2011
Pseudocladochonus Versluys, 1907
Rhodelinda Bayer, 1981
Rolandia de Lacaze-Duthiers, 1900
Sarcodictyon Forbes (in Johnston), 1847
Schizophytum Studer, 1891
Scleranthelia Studer, 1878
Scyphopodium Bayer, 1981
Stereosoma Hickson, 1930
Stereotelesto Bayer, 1981
Stragulum Ofwegen & Haddad, 2011
Telesto Lamouroux, 1812
Telestula Madsen, 1944
Tesseranthelia Bayer, 1981
Trachythela Verrill, 1922

References

 
Stolonifera
Cnidarian families